Maha Yazawin Thit (also known as Myanmar Yazawin Thit or Yazawin Thit) is a national chronicle of Burma (Myanmar). Completed in 1798, the chronicle was the first attempt by the Konbaung court to update and check the accuracy of Maha Yazawin, the standard chronicle of the previous Toungoo Dynasty. Its author Twinthin Taikwun Maha Sithu consulted several existing written sources, and over 600 stone inscriptions collected from around the kingdom between 1783 and 1793. It is the first historical document in Southeast Asia compiled in consultation with epigraphic evidence.

The chronicle updates the events up to 1785, and contains several corrections and critiques of earlier chronicles. However, the chronicle was not well received, and ultimately rejected by the king and the court who found the critiques of earlier chronicles excessively harsh. It became known as A-pe-gan Yazawin (the "Discarded Chronicle").

Nonetheless, when Hmannan Yazawin, the first officially accepted chronicle of Konbaung Dynasty, appeared in 1832, it had incorporated many of Yazawin Thit's corrections, in particular regnal dates of Pagan period kings. Modern scholarship notes the chronicle's innovative use of epigraphy but does not find the chronicle's criticisms harsh. Rather, scholarship maintains that for its criticisms and corrections, the chronicle largely retains traditional narratives, and "was —as elsewhere in the world —written with didactic intentions".

It remains one of the lesser known chronicles today.

The name
The chronicle is sometimes reported as Myanma Yazawin Thit, lit. the "New Chronicle of Myanmar". However, Thaw Kaung, the former Chief Librarian of the Universities Central Library in Yangon, writes that the original name found in the two extant original manuscripts stored at the Central Library is Maha Yazawin Thit, and that the name "Myanmar" was inserted in the title in 1968 by the publisher of that edition. Thaw Kaung adds that the 1968 copy was picked up by international scholars who subsequently reported the chronicle under the name of Myanma Yazawin Thit. The name Myanma Yazawin Thit continues to be used in English language works.

Background
The chronicle has its beginnings in a seemingly unrelated royal project. On 24 July 1783, King Bodawpaya issued a royal decree to: (1) collect stone inscriptions from all important monasteries and pagodas around the kingdom, (2) study them to demarcate religious glebe lands from taxable lands, and (3) recast the inscriptions if necessary. He put Twinthin Taikwun Maha Sithu, his former tutor and chief interior minister, and Thetpan Atwinwun Yaza Bala Kyawhtin, another senior minister, in charge of the effort. The two ministers moved hundreds of inscriptions to then capital Amarapura, and began to study them.

Though the purpose of the project was to verify claims to tax-free religious property, Twinthin, a "learned polymath", quickly noticed several discrepancies between the dates given in Maha Yazawin, the standard chronicle of the monarchy, and the dates given in the contemporary inscriptions he was examining. (Twinthin had already written a biographic chronicle of King Alaungpaya in 1770.) He reported his early findings to the king. The king, who was interested in reading history and had wanted to update Maha Yazawin, commissioned "a new chronicle of the realm which would be more in accord with the stone inscriptions". He appointed Twinthin to write the new chronicle.

Organization and content
Twinthin, who may have been writing a chronicle as early as 1782, predating the inscription collection project, began writing the chronicle in earnest after the collection was completed in 1793. He referenced several existing chronicles, inscriptions as well as eigyin and mawgun poems. He completed the new chronicle in 1798 in 15 volumes (fascicles of parabaik paper). He had updated the events to 1785.

Yazawin Thit is noted for its novel organization and for its criticisms of earlier chronicles. It is organized by dynasties and periods whereas all the other Burmese chronicles (except Zatadawbon Yazawin) are organized strictly along the linear order of kings. (However, Zata is mainly a list of regnal dates and horoscopes, not a full-fledged national chronicle like Yazawin Thit). Twinthin's choice of organizing along dynastic lines was a notable departure from then prevailing practice. All historians of Theravada Buddhist tradition, (Burmese, Sinhalese and Thai), had treated their kings as cakkavatti universal monarchs, rather than kings who were leaders of national groups.

Though organized differently, the chronicle's content closely followed the narratives of the earlier chronicles. The chronicle however does contain several corrections (most notably, regnal dates of earliest kings) and critiques of the earlier chronicles, especially Maha Yazawin. Twinthin highlighted several inconsistencies and mistakes of the earlier chroniclers, and made no apologies for correcting earlier writers' work.

Rejection
Twinthin's critiques were taken by the court as a criticism of one's elders/ancestors, a behavior highly frowned upon in Burmese culture. Although the king himself had commissioned the chronicle, he did not accept the chronicle when his former tutor presented it to him. The chronicle came to be viewed as the "antithesis" to Maha Yazawin's "thesis", and became known as A-pe-gan Yazawin (the "Discarded Chronicle").

Twinthin's views are not viewed as harsh by modern academics. Pe Maung Tin notes that Yazawin Thit "with all its criticisms, on the whole follows the Great Chronicle" (Maha Yazawin). The author, for all his academic zeal, still "shared the purpose of early writers to legitimize the dynasty", and "had similar priorities in terms of content" with early chroniclers.

Significance
The chronicle is the first known historical document in Southeast Asia to use epigraphic sources. According to (Woolf 2011), it shows that historians in Southeast Asia were using epigraphy for sourcing and verification around the same time as the practice was first used in Europe, even if Twinthin's methods may not have "evolved into a formal method". Woolf continues that "We should not overstate the 'scientific' character of these works since much Burmese historiography was — as elsewhere in the world — written with didactic intentions."

Using epigraphy, Twinthin updated the regnal dates of earliest Burmese kingdoms. Hmannan, the official chronicle of Konbaung court, would retain nearly all of Twinthin's corrections. The table below shows a comparison of the regnal dates of Pagan Dynasty. Hmannan's dates largely follow Yazawin Thit's.

Current status
For all its groundbreaking introductions, the chronicle remains one of the "lesser known" chronicles today. Moreover, only the first 13 of the total 15 volumes have been found and published. (The Universities Central Library of Myanmar has portions of two original manuscripts of the chronicle. Of the original 15 volumes, only the first 13 volumes, which cover up to 1754, have survived. The 14th volume is believed to be the same as Twinthin's 1770 work, Alaungpaya Ayedawbon, the biographic chronicle of King Alaungpaya, covering up to 1760. It means the last volume, which covers from 1760 to 1785, has not been recovered. The last volume did exist as it was referenced by later Konbaung writers.)

Notes

References

Bibliography
 
 
 
 
 
 
 

1798 non-fiction books
18th-century history books
Burmese chronicles
Burmese literature
History of Myanmar
Burmese Buddhist texts